John Cruz may refer to:
John A. Cruz (born 1954), Guamanian politician
John F. Cruz, American politician
John Lloyd Cruz (born 1983), Filipino actor
John Cruz (luthier) American guitar builder